Rise Wrestling (stylized as RiSE Wrestling or RISE Wrestling and often referred to simply as RiSE) was an American, independent women's professional wrestling promotion. It airs events on Internet pay-per-view (iPPV by subscription) and hosts live events around the US.

History
Rise was created in 2016 by former Shimmer ring announcer and associate executive producer Kevin Harvey. Initially created to be a discovery and development program for Shimmer, the company created wrestling seminars hosted around the nation to introduce talent to the industry, and to scout talent. The company hosted the Rise PPV's and in 2017 began weekly tapings called Rise ASCENT, touring across the US. In 2018, the company announced a partnership with Impact Wrestling and hosted Impact talent on Rise events. Rise held its last event on October 23, 2020.

Championships

The inaugural Phoenix of Rise Champion was Angel Dust, who defeated Britt Baker, Delilah Doom and Kate Carney at RISE 1. The inaugural Guardians of Rise Champions are Paradise Lost who won the titles in a four corners elimination match at RiSE of the Knockouts PPV defeating Chelsea Green and Britt Baker, Jessica Troy and Charli Evans, and Kylie Rae and Miranda Alize.

Phoenix of Rise Championship

Reigns 

Guardians of Rise Championship

Reigns 

Events

References

External links

Live event subscription - http://riseascent.com/

Women's professional wrestling promotions
Shimmer Women Athletes
2016 establishments in Illinois
Independent professional wrestling promotions based in the Midwestern United States